Kesses Dam (or Lake Lessos) is a small man-made lake in Kenya. It is one of the sources of the Yala River.
It is used as a source of water for irrigation and domestic use, and also for boating and other water activities.

Location

Kesses Dam is in Kesses Sub County of Uasin Gishu County, on a plateau in Rift Valley.
The climate is cool and temperate.
The region has level terrain with medium gradient hills with shallow depressions.
There are wetlands and small permanent streams.

It receives most of its water from the Tarakwa and Nderugut rivers, which enter the reservoir from the east through a swamp of Typha latifolia and Cyperus species.
The outlet is the Sambul River to the west.
The reservoir is one of the Yala River's main sources.

Development

Jorgensen got the support of six of his neighbors to build a dam, which cost £3,000.
As of 1967 there was a yacht club at the dam.

During the May 1984 parliamentary debate over establishing Moi University at Eldoret it was pointed out that Lake Lessos was nearby and was one of the largest man-made lakes, so the new university would have a plentiful supply of water, an important consideration due to the dry climate.
The lake was not being used at the time.
It could also be used for experiments by the students taking fisheries courses, and by a yacht club.
A large water pipe was installed to carry water to the university.

In a parliamentary debate in 1991 it was noted that the dam was at present only supplying Moi University.
However, the dam had been made higher, expanding the reservoir to hold more water, and could be used to supply homesteads in the area.
Work was underway to raise the height of the dam and surveys were in progress to bring the water to areas around the Kesses Centre, Kesses Secondary School, Bombay area and residential areas between Kesses Centre and Moi University.

Wildlife

In 1978–1988 the reservoir was used for wintering by several migratory duck species.
Mean annual numbers were Wigeon: 8, Northern pintail: 45, Garganey: 105 and Shoveler: 60.

The first fish to be introduced were Tilapiine cichlids.
In 1990 and 1996 about 5,000 fingerlings of Nile tilapia (Oreochromis niloticus) were introduced.
Barbus and Gambusia species have also been observed.
Clinostomum parasites were found in 75% of a sample of fish taken in 2010–2011 from Kesses Dam, with higher levels among males than females.
The relatively high levels may be due in part to waste water being released into the reservoir from the nearby urban center and school.

Activities

The lake is used as a recreational center by the Moi University students, and by the local people and visitors.
Activities include boating, fishing, birdwatching and sitatunga viewing.

Notes

Sources

Lakes of Kenya